Eric David Manes is a feature film and television writer and producer, owner of Swiss chocolate company Coco Suisse with his wife Marianne Manes, and a State of California Registered Investment Advisor.

Biography
Manes produced the documentary Voices of Iraq, for which he funneled digital video cameras to hundreds of Iraqis in the midst of war. The Iraqis interviewed thousands of their compatriots. Within six months, the film was finished, marketed, and distributed for theatrical release in the United States. Because of its unparalleled intimacy and access to Iraqis, the footage was featured on This Week with George Stephanopoulos. Manes guided Voices of Iraq through its worldwide release and festival circuit, bringing it to Edinburgh, Melbourne, Locarno, and South Korea.

Manes produced the $40 million budgeted 3000 Miles to Graceland (starring Kevin Costner, Kurt Russell, Christian Slater and Courteney Cox) for Warner Bros. Manes also wrote and produced the feature film Campfire Tales (starring Amy Smart, Jimmy Marsden, Ron Livingston, and Christine Taylor) for New Line Cinema and the indie comedy Phat Beach (with "Entourage” creator Doug Ellin and starring Coolio).

His film and television screenplays include Warner Bros.’ Dodging Bullets for Will Smith and Halle Berry, Paramount’s The Brazilian, and 20th Century Fox’s Hindenburg for Jan de Bont.  He created and executive produced “HRT” (starring Michael Rooker and Ernie Hudson) for CBS and Columbia TriStar and “Catch” for CBS. With Doug Liman, Manes reinvented “CHiPs” for NBC and Warner Bros. He also created the reality show “Mayor” for Columbia TriStar. In 2002, NBC/Studios USA signed Manes to an exclusive writing/producing contract.  He wrote and executive produced "Witch Doctor", a TV pilot for Beacon TV and ABC television studios in 2008.

For CBS, he created and executive produced television pilots with Academy Award winning producer Mark Johnson. In 2000, Manes convinced MTV to gamble on a reality show where contestants film themselves while completing challenges in the world's most haunted locations. The result was MTV's Fear, MTV's second highest rated show in 2000 and 2001, which Manes created and executive produced.

Prior to this, Manes founded a post-production facility that American Cinematographer magazine noted for its innovative use of inexpensive, cutting edge, post-production technology to finish indie films.

In 2011, DirecTV, Technicolor, and Panasonic got together to finance an experimental 3D film for Manes to produce and shoot on Panasonic's new 3D camera systems. DirecTV will distribute the 3D film internationally.

Born in New York City, Manes studied business and philosophy at New York University and is a member of the Writers Guild of America.

Selected filmography

See also
History of Film
Documentary Film
Reality Television
Voices of Iraq
MTV's Fear
Campfire Tales
3000 Miles to Graceland

References

External links

Living people
American male screenwriters
American film producers
American television producers
American chief executives
New York University alumni
Year of birth missing (living people)